The Golden Age is a 1988 album by The Legendary Pink Dots.

Track listing

(*) Not included on original LP editions – taken from the Blacklist 12".

Personnel
Edward Ka-Spel – vocals, keyboards
The Silverman (Phil Knight) – keyboards, samples, loops
Patrick Q Wright – violins, viola, keyboards, drum programming, percussion
Hanz Myre – saxophones, flute, electronix

Additional personnel
Bob Pistoor – guitar
Hanz Myre – engineer

Notes
The SPV edition contains different artwork than that of the other editions.

References

1989 albums
The Legendary Pink Dots albums